Bangkok Airways Public Company Limited is a regional airline based in Bangkok, Thailand. It operates scheduled services  to destinations in Thailand, Cambodia, China, Hong Kong, India, Laos, Malaysia, Maldives, Myanmar, Singapore, and Vietnam.  Its main base is Suvarnabhumi Airport.

History
The airline was established in 1968 as Sahakol Air, operating air taxi services under contract from the Overseas International Construction Company (OICC), an American construction company, the United States Operations Mission (USOM), and a number of other organisations engaged in oil and natural gas exploration in the Gulf of Thailand. It began scheduled services in 1986, becoming Thailand's first privately owned domestic airline. It rebranded to become Bangkok Airways in 1989. The airline is owned by Prasert Prasarttong-Osoth (92.31 percent), Sahakol Estate (4.3 percent), Bangkok Dusit Medical Services (1.2 percent), and other shareholders (2.19 percent). At one point, it also wholly owned subsidiary airline Siem Reap Airways in Cambodia.

It built its own airport on Ko Samui, which opened in April 1989 and offers direct flights between the island and Chiang Mai, Hong Kong, Krabi, Pattaya, Phuket, and Singapore. The airline opened its second airport in Sukhothai Province in 1996. A third airport was built in Trat Province, opening in March 2003 to serve the tourism destination of Ko Chang.

The airline made its first foray into jet aircraft in 2000, when it started adding Boeing 717s to its fleet. Until that time, Bangkok Airways had flown propeller-driven aircraft, primarily the ATR 72. It had also operated the De Havilland Canada Dash 8, the Shorts 330 and for a short time a Fokker 100. The carrier added another jet, the Airbus A320, to its fleet in 2004.

Bangkok Airways planned to order wide-body aircraft as part of its ambition to expand its fleet but these plans to expand to the long haul market eventually fell short. It wanted to add its first wide-body jets in 2006 to serve longer-haul destinations such as the UK, India, and Japan and is looking at Airbus A330, Airbus A340 and Boeing 787 aircraft. In December 2005, Bangkok Airways announced it had decided to negotiate an order for six Airbus A350-800 aircraft in a 258-seat configuration, to be delivered to the airline commencing 2013 but the order of the aircraft was cancelled in 2011 due to the further delay of the Airbus plane.

In 2007, Royal Household Secretary General Kaewkwan Watcharoethai awarded Prasert Prasarttong-Osoth a royal warrant to display the Garuda emblem.

In 2017, Bangkok Airways received a new Air Operator Certificate, recertified to safety standards set out by ICAO from the Civil Aviation Authority of Thailand.

Financials
For the fiscal year ending 31 December 2019, Bangkok Airways reported a profit of 351 million baht on revenues of 29,418 million baht. Its assets were valued at 61,908 million baht. BA lost 300 million baht during the first quarter of 2020, compared with a profit of 500 million baht a year earlier. Earnings have continued to decline due to the COVID-19 pandemic, and the airline has asked for government assistance. As of 31 December 2019, BA employed 3,010 persons.

Destinations

, Bangkok Airways flies to the following destinations:

Codeshare agreements
As of 31 December 2019, Bangkok Airways had codeshare agreements with 27 airlines.

 Aeroflot
 Air Astana
 British Airways
 Cathay Pacific
 China Airlines
 El Al
 Emirates
 Etihad Airways
 EVA Air
 Garuda Indonesia
 Japan Airlines
 Lao Airlines
 Malaysia Airlines
 Philippine Airlines
 Qantas
 Qatar Airways
 Thai Airways International
 Vietnam Airlines
 Xiamen Airlines

Fleet

Current fleet
, Bangkok Airways operates the following aircraft:

Retired fleet

Airports owned
Bangkok Airways owns and operates three airports:
 Samui Airport (25 April 1989 – present)
 Sukhothai Airport (12 April 1996 – present)
 Trat Airport (8 April 2003 – present)

Incidents and accidents
 On 7 December 1987, a Sahakol Air Hawker Siddeley HS 748 Series 2A (registration HS-THH), was damaged beyond repair after it overran the runway on landing at Udon Thani Airport with no fatalities.
 On 21 November 1990, a de Havilland Canada DHC-8-103 operating as Bangkok Airways Flight 125 crashed on Koh Samui while attempting to land in heavy rain and high winds. All 38 people on board perished.
 In August 2002 an ATR 72-200 skidded off the runway while landing at Siem Reap International Airport. There were no injuries. The airport was closed for two days.
 On 4 August 2009, Bangkok Airways Flight 266, operated by an ATR 72 between Krabi and Koh Samui, skidded off the runway, killing one of the pilots. The 68 passengers were evacuated. Of the passengers evacuated, six sustained serious injuries while another four were treated for minor injuries.

Sponsorship
Bangkok Airways is currently an official sponsor of Chiangrai United, Sukhothai FC, Chiang Mai FC, Trat FC, Lampang FC, Krabi FC, Kasetsart FC, Bangkok Christian College FC and Borussia Dortmund.

References

External links

 Official website
 Bangkok Airways Fleet

Prasarttong-Osoth Co., Ltd.
Airlines of Thailand
Airlines established in 1968
Companies based in Bangkok
Thai Royal Warrant holders
1968 establishments in Thailand
Companies listed on the Stock Exchange of Thailand